Aaron Owens (born March 20, 1974), better known by his nickname "AO", is an American streetball player from North Philadelphia. 

In 2013, Owens participated in the Ball4Real World Tour. He was on the AND1 Mixtape Tour from its creation until 2007. Owens attended Simon Gratz High School. He attended Salem International University in West Virginia from 1992 to 1993 but did not play basketball for the school. He accepted a scholarship from Fort Hays State University in Hays, Kansas during the 1997-1998 academic year, where he was the starting point guard. At the end of the school year, Owens made the decision to transfer. He then played basketball at Henderson State University in Arkansas from 1998 to 1999, where he graduated in 1999 and was a Division II All-American.

References

External links
 
ESPN Streetball
AO's Twitter

1974 births
Living people
American men's basketball players
AND1
Basketball players from Philadelphia
Dakota Wizards players
Henderson State Reddies men's basketball players
Mobile Revelers players
Point guards
Street basketball players